Valkaičiai (formerly) is a village in Kėdainiai district municipality, in Kaunas County, in central Lithuania. According to the 2011 census, the village had a population of 6 people.

Formerly it was a manor of the Strebeikai family. There was beer and spirit distilleries, a water mill.

Demography

References

Villages in Kaunas County
Kėdainiai District Municipality